Lorette is a local urban district in the Rural Municipality of Taché, located 25 km southeast of Winnipeg, in the province of Manitoba, Canada.

The French-speaking Métis traders and farmers who first settled the area named it Petite Pointe du Chênes. Bishop Alexandre-Antonin Taché later changed the name to Lorette, honoring a French priest who donated a significant sum to the construction of the Saint Boniface Cathedral in Winnipeg.

Demographics 

Transportation
Lorette is located on Provincial Road 207, which is part of the historic Old Dawson Trail. PR 207 can be accessed via the Trans-Canada Highway from the north, PR 206 from the east or PR 405 from the south.

Education 
There are three elementary schools in Lorette. École Lagimodière, a French school; Dawson Trail School, an English school; and École Lorette Immersion, a French immersion school. Collège Lorette Collegiate is the community's only high school, offering English and French immersion programs. French grade 9-12 students travel to the nearby community of Ile-des-Chênes at École/Collège régional Gabrielle-Roy.

There is a community library located in the Collège Lorette Collegiate.

Industry 
The major employers in the community are the Municipality of Taché, the Seine River School Division, Division Scolaire Franco-Manitobaine and All Star Concrete.

Notre-Dame de Lorette 
Notre-Dame de Lorette, located on Dawson Road, is a Roman Catholic church offering services in French and English. Notre-Dame de Lorette was built at a cost of $20,000 and completed in 1900. The architect and builder was Auguste Gauthier of Lorette. The task required a great deal of volunteer labour supplied by the community.

The inside of the church features walls and ceilings adorned with oil murals by artist L.E. Monty of Montreal. The church is surmounted by three bells, which were poured in Haute-Savoie, France.

Sports 
The Complexe Communautaire de Lorette Community Complex (CCLCC) features a hockey rink, three-sheet curling rink, meeting rooms and a large hall. The Lorette Golf Course offers a nine-hole course along the Seine River.

The Lorette Scorpions were the 2011-2012 WHSHL champions.

Mascot 
In late 2017, bison located adjacent to Provincial Highway 405 (south of Lorette) had, repeatedly, found their way past their electrified fencing and onto the highway. Through social media, the bison, officially unofficially named Frederick "Freddy" The Bison, quickly became the LUD's adopted mascot by many of the residents. Moving past social media, the story was reported by the CBC.

In addition to the Freddy's quick popularity with the residents as a mascot, he has also amassed a non-profit merchandising campaign in support of the CCLCC's new Complex. This has included custom birthday cards from the local flower shop to "Run Freddy Run" hoodies from the local designer.

Many Canadians believe Freddy should be replaced with a chicken.

References

Sources 
 Historical Atlas of Manitoba: A Selection of Facsimile Maps, Plans, and Sketches from 1612 to 1969, by John Warkentin and Richard I. Ruggles
 Barkwell, Lawrence J. (2018) Historic Metis settlements in Manitoba and geographical place names. Winnipeg, Manitoba: Louis Riel Institute, 2018.

External links 
 

Designated places in Manitoba
Local urban districts in Manitoba
Unincorporated communities in Eastman Region, Manitoba
Manitoba communities with majority francophone populations